Ruth Sager (February 7, 1918 – March 29, 1997) was an American geneticist. Sager enjoyed two scientific careers. Her first was in the 1950s and 1960s when she pioneered the field of cytoplasmic genetics by discovering transmission of genetic traits through chloroplast DNA, the first known example of genetics not involving the cell nucleus. The academic community did not acknowledge the significance of her contribution until after the second wave of feminism in the 1970s. Her second career began in the early 1970s and was in cancer genetics; she proposed and investigated the roles of tumor suppressor genes.

Life

Sager was born on February 7, 1918, in Chicago, Illinois, one of three daughters of Leon B. Sager, an advertising executive, and Deborah Borovik Sager. Following Sager's birth, her mother died from the influenza epidemic of the time. Sager and her sisters, Esther and Naomi, were raised by their step mother Hannah. At 16 Sager had graduated from New Trier High school. After, she attended the University of Chicago and earned her S.B. in mammalian physiology in 1938. Following, she attended the Rutgers University and received her M.S. in plant physiology in 1944. During World War II Sager had left academia to work as a secretary and an apple farmer. Following the war Sager had received her Ph.D. in maize genetics from Columbia University under Marcus M. Rhodes. In 1944 she married Seymour Melman; in 1973 she married Arthur Pardee. She died of bladder cancer in Brookline, Massachusetts in 1997.

Education

Sager matriculated at the University of Chicago at the age of 16, to study liberal arts but switched her major to biology, initially with the intention of attending medical school, after finding she enjoyed science classes the most. She received her undergraduate degree in 1938, then, deciding she would prefer research to practicing medicine, she sought a master's degree in plant physiology from Rutgers University. Here she performed wartime research on the growth of tomato seedlings and received a master's degree in 1944. She received a doctorate in maize genetics from Columbia University in 1948, for work performed under Marcus Rhoades, and with Barbara McClintock.

Research and career

Sager was awarded a Merck Fellowship from the National Research Council in 1949, and worked as a postdoctoral fellow at the Rockefeller Institute on the chloroplast from 1949 to 1951 in the laboratory of Sam Granick. She was promoted to a staff position (assistant in the biochemistry division) in 1951, working in this capacity until 1955, using the alga Chlamydomonas reinhardtii as a model organism. She performed breeding experiments with the algae, mating strains that were resistant to the chloroplast inhibiting agent streptomycin with strains that were stretomycin-sensitive. Unlike what would be expected if the trait were passed down following traditional Mendelian inheritance, she found that the offspring only showed the streptomycin sensitivity/resistance trait of one of their parents. This research provided evidence for non-Mendelian uniparental inheritance; it also showed that there are multiple independent genetic systems in Chlamydomonas. She found further evidence when she mapped the streptomycin sensitivity/resistance trait and found a stable, nonchromosomal inheritance system that she proposed may have arisen before chromosomes. She was the first person to publish extensive genetic mapping of a cellular organelle.

She joined Columbia University's zoology department as a research associate in 1955, supported by funding from the United States Public Health Service and the National Science Foundation. She was promoted to senior research associate in the early 1960s, but she had difficulty obtaining a faculty position due to initial skepticism surrounding cytoplasmic inheritance from the scientific community, as well as gender discrimination. It wasn't until 1966, 18 years after receiving her doctorate, that Hunter College invited her to be a professor of biology.

Sager changed her research focus to cancer biology in the 1970s, with a specific focus on breast cancer, and spent time researching at London's Imperial Cancer Research Fund Laboratory from 1972 to 1973, where she met her future husband, Arthur Pardee. In 1975 she joined the Department of Microbiology and Molecular Genetics at Harvard Medical School as a professor of cellular genetics, where she served as chief of the Division of Cancer Genetics at the affiliated Dana–Farber Cancer Institute. Her research there focused on the genetic and molecular causes of cancer, including investigation of the roles of tumor suppressor genes, DNA methylation, and chromosomal instability in tumor growth and spread. Sager was one of the first people to emphasize the importance of such genes. She identified over 100 potential tumor suppressor genes and performed extensive research into a specific tumor suppressor gene called maspin (mammary serine protease inhibitor) She developed cell culture methods to study normal and cancerous human and other mammalian cells in the laboratory and pioneered the research into "expression genetics," the study of altered gene expression.

She was elected a fellow of the National Academy of Sciences in 1977 and the American Academy of Arts and Sciences in 1979. In 1988 Sagar was awarded the Gilbert Morgan Smith Medal from the National Academy of Sciences.

Sager published two classic textbooks: Cell Heredity (1961), co-written by Francis Ryan and considered by some to be the first molecular biology textbook; and Cytoplasmic Genes and Organelles (1972).

Selected honors and awards
 Guggenheim Fellowship, 1972
 Elected fellow of the National Academy of Sciences, 1977
 Elected fellow of the American Academy of Arts and Sciences, 1979
 Outstanding Investigator Award, National Cancer Institute, 1985
 Gilbert Morgan Smith Medal, National Academy of Sciences, 1988
 Princess Takamatso Lecturer in Japan, 1990
 Alumna of the Year, University of Chicago, 1994

Selected publications

References

Further reading
 

1918 births
1997 deaths
People from Brookline, Massachusetts
American geneticists
University of Chicago alumni
Rutgers University alumni
Columbia University alumni
Hunter College faculty
Harvard Medical School faculty
Deaths from bladder cancer
Deaths from cancer in Massachusetts
Fellows of the American Academy of Arts and Sciences
American women biologists
Women molecular biologists
20th-century American women
American women academics
Members of the National Academy of Medicine